Miguel Ángel J. Márquez Ruiz (born September 11, 1942, in Mexico City, Mexico), is a Mexican veterinarian with over 50 years of professional practice, who has received international recognition for his contributions to veterinary medicine. He teaches at the Faculty of Veterinary Medicine of the National Autonomous University of Mexico (UNAM) and has carried out intensive work through the years in the areas of clinical pathology, virology, immunology and avian epidemiology.

Education 
 Graduated at the Veterinary Medicine School. National Autonomous University of Mexico. Mexico City. 1960–1964
 Specialization Degree in Poultry Viral Diseases at the University of Liverpool, England in 1968
 Master of Veterinary Sciences at l' École de Medicine Vétérinaire d'Alfort. Paris, France. 1972–1974
 Diplomate in Business Administration. Panamerican Institute for High Business Direction. Mexico. 1992
 Diplomate of the American College of Poultry Veterinarians. Baltimore, Maryland. 1998
 PhD in History and its Sources. Faculty of Philosophy and Letters, University of Leon, Spain. CUM LAUDE. 2006

Memberships 
 Member of the American Association of Avian Pathologists (AAAP) in 1969
 Founding Member in 1970 and twice Chairman of the Mexican Association of Poultry Veterinarians/ANECA in 1975 & 1981
 Founder and President of the Mexican Society for the History of Veterinary Medicine. Mexico. 1987–2001 
 Member of the Mexican Society for the History and Philosophy of the Medicine in 1993
 Academic Numerary Member of the Mexican Academy of Veterinary Medicine (AVM) in 1997
 Member of the Societé Française d'Histoire de la Medecine et des Sciences Veterinaires. Paris, 2005
 Correspondent Academic Member of Academy of Veterinary Sciences of Catalonia. Barcelona, 2008
 Correspondent Academic Member of Royal Academy of Veterinary Sciences of Spain. Madrid, 2009

Awards and recognition 
 National Award "Goat of Picasso" given by the Mexican Association of Caprine Practitioners. Mexico, 1992
 National Award "ANECA" given by the Mexican Association of Poultry Specialists. Cancun, 1996
 Appointed "Veterinarian of the Year" by the Veterinary Medicine College of Jalisco. Guadalajara, 2006
 Medal to the "Academical Merit". Faculty of Veterinary Medicine. UNAM. Mexico, 2008
 Medal to the "University Merit". National University of Mexico. UNAM. Mexico, 2009
 Member of the "Hall of Fame of the Latin American Poultry Industry". Buenos Aires, Argentina, 2011 
 "Centaur Cheiron Award", given by the World Association for the History of Veterinary Medicine. University of Utrecht. The Netherlands, 2012

Publications 
More than 400 publications in avian medicine and in the history of medicine, science and technology.

Books 
 Albeytería and Albéytares in the New Spain during the XVI Century (Farriery and Farriers in the New Spain during the XVI Century) published by the University of Leon, Spain in 1996
 Epizootics, Zoonoses and Epidemics. The interchange of pathogens between the Old and New World published by the University of Leon, Spain in 2006
 History of the National Association of Poultry Producers of Mexico. Veracruz, 2008
 History of the Mexican Association of Veterinarians Specialized on Swine. Mazatlan, 2013
 Newcastle Disease. Argentina, 2013

Lectures 
More than 500 lectures given in more than 40 countries.

Notes

References 
  The interchange of pathogens between the Old and New World, the cases of rabies and canine distemper.
  Libro Historia de la Unión Nacional de Avicultores de México

External links
  El Salón de la Fama de la Avicultura Latinoamericana
  Real Academia de Ciencias Veterinarias

Mexican veterinarians
Male veterinarians
Mexican non-fiction writers
Academic staff of the National Autonomous University of Mexico
1942 births
Living people